This is a List of German mathematicians.

A 

 Ilka Agricola
 Rudolf Ahlswede
 Wilhelm Ahrens
 Oskar Anderson
 Karl Apfelbacher
 Philipp Apian
 Petrus Apianus
 Michael Artin
 Günter Asser
 Bruno Augenstein
 Georg Aumann

B 

 Isaak Bacharach
 Paul Gustav Heinrich Bachmann
 Reinhold Baer
 Christian Bär
 Wolf Barth
 Friedrich L. Bauer
 August Beer
 Walter Benz
 Rudolf Berghammer
 Felix Bernstein
 Ludwig Berwald
 Friedrich Bessel
 Karl Bobek
 Friedrich Böhm
 Oskar Bolza
 Karl-Heinz Boseck
 Hermann Bottenbruch
 Benjamin Bramer
 Andreas Brandstädt
 Heinrich Brandt
 Richard Brauer
 Hel Braun
 Alexander von Brill
 Adolf Ferdinand Wenceslaus Brix
 Max Brückner
 Heinrich Bruns
 Roland Bulirsch
 Johann Karl Burckhardt
 Heinrich Burkhardt
 Hans Heinrich Bürmann

C 

 Georg Cantor
 Constantin Carathéodory
 Wilhelm Cauer
 Ludolph van Ceulen
 Otfried Cheong
 David Christiani
 Christopher Clavius
 Stephan Cohn-Vossen
 Paul Cohn
 Armin B. Cremers
 Peter Crüger

D 

 Richard Dedekind
 Herbert von Denffer
 Christopher Deninger
 Otto Dersch
 Max Deuring
 Anton Deusing
 Wolfgang Doeblin
 Gustav Doetsch
 Andreas Dress

E 

 Heinz-Dieter Ebbinghaus
 Carl Gottlieb Ehler
 Martin Eichler
 Lorentz Eichstadt
 Bettina Eick
 Kirsten Eisenträger
 Joachim Engel
 Karin Erdmann
 Andreas von Ettingshausen

F 

 Johann Faulhaber
 Gustav Fechner
 Dmitry Feichtner-Kozlov
 Käte Fenchel
 Paul Finsler
 Felix Finster
 Bernd Fischer
 Hans Fitting
 Andreas Floer
 W. Frahm
 Wilhelm von Freeden
 Gottlob Frege
 Gerhard Frey
 Bruno von Freytag-Löringhoff
 Robert Fricke
 Robert Frucht
 Wolfgang Heinrich Johannes Fuchs
 Joseph Furttenbach
 Philipp Furtwängler

G 

 David Gans
 Nina Gantert
 Harald Garcke
 Joachim von zur Gathen
 Carl Friedrich Gauss
 Gerhard Geise
 Heide Gluesing-Luerssen
 Johannes von Gmunden
 Christian Goldbach
 Kurt Gödel
 Adolph Göpel
 Rudolf Gorenflo
 Lothar Göttsche
 Hermann Grassmann
 Heinrich Friedrich Gretschel
 Michael Griebel
 Martin Grötschel
 Detlef Gromoll
 Nicolas Guisnée

H 

 Wolfgang Hackbusch
 Arndt von Haeseler
 Elisabeth Hagemann
 Wolfgang Hahn
 Rudolf Halin
 Ursula Hamenstädt
 Johannes Hancke
 Wolfgang Händler
 Hermann Hankel
 Raphael Levi Hannover
 Carl Gustav Axel Harnack
 Paul Harzer
 Helmut Hasse
 Maria Hasse
 Otto Hesse
 Felix Hausdorff
 Eduard Heine
 Dieter Held
 Kurt Hensel
 Ferdinand Ernst Karl Herberstein
 Maximilian Herzberger
 Edmund Hess
 Karl Hessenberg
 David Hilbert
 Friedrich Hirzebruch
 Eberhard Hopf
 Heinz Hopf
 Jakob Horn
 Günter Hotz
 Annette Huber-Klawitter
 Klaus Hulek
 Gerhard Hund
 Adolf Hurwitz

I 

 Ilse Ipsen
 Caspar Isenkrahe

J 

 Carl Gustav Jacob Jacobi
 Eugen Jahnke
 Ferdinand Joachimsthal
 Philipp von Jolly
 Wilhelm Jordan
 Jürgen Jost
 Joachim Jungius

K 

 Erich Kähler
 Margarete Kahn
 Gabriele Kaiser
 Theodor Kaluza
 Erich Kamke
 Ralph Kaufmann
 Julia Kempe
 Johannes Kepler
 Felix Klein
 Alfred Kneschke
 Adolf Kneser
 Hellmuth Kneser
 Martin Kneser
 Herbert Koch
 Karl-Rudolf Koch
 Rudolf Kochendörffer
 Leo Königsberger
 Gottfried Köthe
 Ernst Kötter
 Gerhard Kowalewski
 Leopold Kronecker
 Johann Heinrich Louis Krüger
 Ulrich Kulisch

L 

 Georg Landsberg
 Karl Christian von Langsdorf
 Johann Lantz
 Wilhelm Leber
 Gottfried Wilhelm Leibniz
 Kurt Leichtweiss
 Wolfgang Leinberer
 Thomas Lengauer
 Heinrich-Wolfgang Leopoldt
 Jacob Leupold
 Ferdinand von Lindemann
 Rudolf Lipschitz
 Peter Littelmann
 Martin Löb
 Alfred Loewy
 Paul Lorenzen
 Leopold Löwenheim
 Yuri Luchko
 Wolfgang Lück
 Stephan Luckhaus
 Günter Lumer
 Jacob Lüroth

M 

 Michael Maestlin
 Paul Mahlo
 Helmut Maier
 Hans Carl Friedrich von Mangoldt
 Yuri Manin
 Jens Marklof
 Johannes Marquart
 Christian Gustav Adolph Mayer
 Johann Tobias Mayer
 Ernst Mayr
 Gustav Ferdinand Mehler
 Ludwig Mehlhorn
 Nicholas Mercator
 Franz Mertens
 Uta Merzbach
 Richard Meyer
 Preda Mihăilescu
 Hermann Minkowski
 Otfrid Mittmann
 August Ferdinand Möbius
 Arnold Möller
 Karl Mollweide
 Robert Edouard Moritz
 Jürgen Moser
 Ruth Moufang
John Müller
 Stefan Müller
 Werner Müller
 Herman Müntz

N 

 Valentin Naboth
 Frank Natterer
 Gabriele Nebe
 Leonard Nelson
 Eugen Netto
 Jürgen Neukirch
 Carl Neumann
 Hanna Neumann
 Walter Neumann
 Mara Neusel
 Nicholas of Cusa
 Carsten Niebuhr
 Hans-Volker Niemeier
 Barbara Niethammer
 Joachim Nitsche
 Georg Nöbeling
 Emmy Noether
 Fritz Noether
 Max Noether
 Frieda Nugel

O 

 Adam Olearius
 Friedrich Wilhelm Opelt
 Volker Oppitz
 Felix Otto

P 

 Moritz Pasch
 Heinz-Otto Peitgen
 Rose Peltesohn
 Oskar Perron
 Fritz Peter
 Stefanie Petermichl
 Hans Petersson
 Carl Adam Petri
 Johann Wilhelm Andreas Pfaff
 Michael Pfannkuche
 Albrecht Pfister
 Adolf Piltz
 Julius Plücker
 Leo August Pochhammer
 Burkard Polster
 Johannes Praetorius
 William Prager
 Alfred Pringsheim
 Heinz Prüfer
 Friedrich Prym

R 

 Rodolphe Radau
 Thomas von Randow
 Michael Rapoport
 Regiomontanus
 Karin Reich
 Julius Reichelt
 Hermann of Reichenau
 Kurt Reidemeister
 Christian Reiher
 Nicolaus Reimers
 Erasmus Reinhold
 Michel Reiss
 Eric Reissner
 Roberet Remak
 Reinhold Remmert
 Lasse Rempe-Gillen
 Theodor Reye
 Hans-Egon Richert
 Michael M. Richter
 Bernhard Riemann
 Adam Ries
 Willi Rinow
 Abraham Robinson
 Michael Röckner
 Werner Wolfgang Rogosinski
 Karl Rohn
 Helmut Röhrl
 Alex F. T. W. Rosenberg
 Johann Georg Rosenhain
 Arthur Rosenthal
 Markus Rost
 Heinrich August Rothe
 Thomas Royen
 Ferdinand Rudio
 Christoph Rudolff
 Carl David Tolmé Runge
 Iris Runge

S 

 Hans Samelson
 Björn Sandstede
 Lisa Sauermann
 Mathias Schacht
 Helmut H. Schaefer
 Friedrich Wilhelm Schäfke
 Paul Schatz
 Ludwig Scheeffer
 Arnd Scheel
 Georg Scheffers
 Adolf Schepp
 Heinrich Scherk
 Otto Schilling
 Victor Schlegel
 Ludwig Schlesinger
 Oscar Schlömilch
 Wilfried Schmid
 Friedrich Karl Schmidt
 Gunther Schmidt
 Theodor Schneider
 Claus P. Schnorr
 Eckehard Schöll
 Arnold Scholz
 Heinrich Scholz
 Peter Scholze
 Johannes Schöner
 Arnold Schönhage
 Erich Schönhardt
 Gaspar Schott
 Martin Schottenloher
 Hieronymus Schreiber
 Ernst Schröder
 Heinrich G. F. Schröder
 Heinrich Schröter
 Karl Schröter
 Hermann Schubert
 Horst Schubert
 Johann Friedrich Schultz
 Friedrich Schur
 Issai Schur
 Edmund Schuster
 Christof Schütte
 Kurt Schütte
 Hermann Schwarz
 Daniel Schwenter
 Hans Schwerdtfeger
 Christoph Scriba
 Paul Scriptoris
 Karl Seebach
 Paul Seidel
 Philipp Ludwig von Seidel
 Wladimir Seidel
 Herbert Seifert
 Reinhard Selten
 Bernd Siebert
 Carl Ludwig Siegel
 Max Simon
 Peter Slodowy
 Hans Sommer
 Wilhelm Specht
 Emanuel Sperner
 Theodor Spieker
 Herbert Spohn
 Roland Sprague
 Ludwig Staiger
 Simon von Stampfer
 Angelika Steger
 Karl Stein
 Carl August von Steinheil
 Ernst Steinitz
 Moritz Abraham Stern
 Michael Stifel
 Johannes Stöffler
 Josef Stoer
 Uwe Storch
 Volker Strassen
 Reinhold Strassmann
 Aegidius Strauch II
 Karl Strehl
 Thomas Streicher
 Catharina Stroppel
 Michael Struwe
 Eduard Study
 Ulrich Stuhler
 Friedrich Otto Rudolf Sturm
 Johann Sturm
 Karl-Theodor Sturm
 Bernd Sturmfels
 Wilhelm Süss
 John M. Sullivan

T 

 Rosalind Tanner
 Georg Tannstetter
 Oswald Teichmüller
 Bernhard Friedrich Thibaut
 Carl Johannes Thomae
 Gerhard Thomsen
 William Threlfall
 Ulrike Tillmann
 Heinrich Emil Timerding
 Otto Toeplitz
 Johann Georg Tralles
 Abdias Treu
 Walter Trump
 Ehrenfried Walther von Tschirnhaus
 Reidun Twarock
 Dietrich Tzwyvel

U 

 Helmut Ulm

V 

 Theodor Vahlen
 Rüdiger Valk
 Wilhelm Vauck
 Hermann Vermeil
 Eva Viehmann
 Eckart Viehweg
 Vitello
 Kurt Vogel

W 

 Klaus Wagner
 Manfred Wagner
 Friedhelm Waldhausen
 Marion Walter
 Friedrich Heinrich Albert Wangerin
 Eduard Ritter von Weber
 Heinrich Martin Weber
 Werner Weber
 Katrin Wehrheim
 Dieter Weichert
 Joachim Weickert
 Karl Weierstrass
 Erhard Weigel
 Julius Weingarten
 Michael Weiss
 Paul Weiss
 Ernst August Weiß
 Katrin Wendland
 Elisabeth M. Werner
 Johannes Werner
 Hermann Weyl
 Johannes Widmann
 Arthur Wieferich
 Helmut Wielandt
 Anna Wienhard
 Hermann Wilken
 Rudolf Wille
 Thomas Willwacher
 Ernst Eduard Wiltheiss
 Ernst Witt
 Alexander Witting
 Franz Woepcke
 Barbara Wohlmuth
 Paul Wolfskehl
 Hans Wussing
 Peter Wynn

Z 

 Hans Zassenhaus
 Julius August Christoph Zech
 Christian Zeller
 Karl Longin Zeller
 Christoph Zenger
 Sarah Zerbes
 Ernst Zermelo
 Karl Eduard Zetzsche
 Günter M. Ziegler
 Heiner Zieschang
 Johann Jacob Zimmermann
 Thomas Zink
 Benedict Zuckermann

See also
List of mathematicians
List of German scientists
Science and technology in Germany

Lists of mathematicians by nationality
 
Mathematicians